The 1935 St. Louis Cardinals season was the team's 54th season in St. Louis, Missouri and its 44th season in the National League. The Cardinals went 96–58 during the season and finished 2nd in the National League.

Offseason 
 October 2, 1934: Bill Lewis was drafted from the Cardinals by the Boston Braves in the 1934 rule 5 draft.

Regular season 
During the season, Dizzy Dean became the last pitcher to win at least 25 games in one season for the Cardinals in the 20th century.

Season standings

Record vs. opponents

Roster

Player stats

Batting

Starters by position 
Note: Pos = Position; G = Games played; AB = At bats; H = Hits; Avg. = Batting average; HR = Home runs; RBI = Runs batted in

Other batters 
Note: G = Games played; AB = At bats; H = Hits; Avg. = Batting average; HR = Home runs; RBI = Runs batted in

Pitching

Starting pitchers 
Note: G = Games pitched; IP = Innings pitched; W = Wins; L = Losses; ERA = Earned run average; SO = Strikeouts

Other pitchers 
Note: G = Games pitched; IP = Innings pitched; W = Wins; L = Losses; ERA = Earned run average; SO = Strikeouts

Relief pitchers 
Note: G = Games pitched; W = Wins; L = Losses; SV = Saves; ERA = Earned run average; SO = Strikeouts

Awards and honors 
Dizzy Dean, National League Leader, Wins (28)

Farm system 

LEAGUE CHAMPIONS: Bloomington, Huntington, Jacksonville, Rogers

References

External links
1935 St. Louis Cardinals at Baseball Reference
1935 St. Louis Cardinals team page at www.baseball-almanac.com

St. Louis Cardinals seasons
Saint Louis Cardinals season
St Louis Cardinals